I Miss Me may refer to:

 "I Miss Me", a 1995 song by Whale from We Care
 "I Miss Me", a 2004 song by Brad Cotter from Patient Man
 "I Miss Me", a 2018 song by Kyle